The Ryzen family is an x86-64 microprocessor family from AMD, based on the Zen microarchitecture. The Ryzen lineup includes Ryzen 3, Ryzen 5, Ryzen 7, Ryzen 9, and Ryzen Threadripper with up to 64 cores. All consumer Ryzens have an unlocked multiplier and all support Simultaneous Multithreading (SMT) except earlier Zen/Zen+ based desktop Ryzen 3 and Zen/Zen+/Zen 2 (Lucienne excluded) based mobile Ryzen 3.

Desktop processors

Zen based (1st generation)

Summit Ridge (1000 series CPUs)

Whitehaven (1000 series HEDT CPUs)

Raven Ridge (2000 series APUs)

Zen+ based (2nd generation)

Pinnacle Ridge (2000 series CPUs)

Colfax (2000 series HEDT CPUs)

Picasso (3000 series APUs)

Zen 2 based (3rd generation)

Matisse (3000 series CPUs)

Castle Peak (3000 series HEDT/workstation CPUs)

Renoir (4000 series CPUs) 
Based on the Ryzen 4000G series APUs with the integrated GPU disabled.

Renoir (4000 series APUs)

Zen 3 based (4th generation)

Vermeer (5000 series CPUs) 
The Ryzen 5 5500 is a Cezanne APU with its integrated GPU disabled.

Chagall (5000 series workstation CPUs)

Cezanne (5000 series APUs)

Zen 4 based (5th generation)

Raphael (7000 series CPUs)

Mobile processors

Zen based

Raven Ridge (2000 series)

Dalí (3000 series)

Zen+ based

Picasso (3000 series)

Zen 2 based

Renoir (4000 series)

Lucienne (5000 series)

Mendocino (7020 series)

Zen 3 based

Cezanne and Barceló (5000 series) 
Cezanne (2021 models), Barceló (2022 models).

Barcelo-R (7030 series)

Zen 3+ based

Rembrandt (6000 series)

Rembrandt-R (7035 series)

Zen 4 based

Phoenix (7040 series)

Dragon Range (7045 series)

Embedded processors

1000 series

Great Horned Owl (V1000 series, Zen-based)

Banded Kestrel (R1000 series, Zen-based)

2000 series

Grey Hawk (V2000 series, Zen 2-based)

See also 
 Table of AMD processors

References 

AMD Ryzen